The Inhumas or Inhaúma River is a river of Alagoas and Pernambuco states in eastern Brazil. It is the main tributary of the Canhoto River.

See also
List of rivers of Alagoas
List of rivers of Pernambuco

References

Rivers of Alagoas
Rivers of Pernambuco